Kara Keeling is an American humanities academic. As of 2016 she is Associate Professor at the University of Southern California in the Critical Studies of Cinematic Arts and in the Department of American Studies and Ethnicity.

Education and early life
Kara Keeling was born in 1971.

Keeling received her Ph.D. in Critical and Cultural Studies from the University of Pittsburgh. Her father was Rudy Keeling, a prominent basketball coach at Emerson College.

Research and publications
Her research focuses on Third Cinema, African American, African, and feminist film and media; theories and practices of Black liberation; radical imaginaries, with broader interests in critical theory, cultural studies, Africana studies, and gender and sexuality studies.

In 2007, Duke University Press published Keeling's first book, The Witch's Flight: The Cinematic, the Black Femme, and the Image of Common Sense. In this book, Keeling argues that the cinema's ability to structure social reality, thus producing and reifying racism, homophobia, and misogyny, can be disrupted by the figure of the black femme. Despite her lack of representation in hegemonic imagery of race and gender, she haunts that imagery, constantly threatening to make visible alternative social arrangements.

Kara Keeling has also written influential articles such as "Looking for M-: Queer Temporality, Black Political Possibility, and Poetry from the Future," published in GLQ: Journal of Lesbian and Gay Studies in 2009 and "Queer OS" published in Cinema Journal in 2014.

"Looking for M-: Queer Temporality, Black Political Possibility, and Poetry from the Future"
In her article "Looking for M-: Queer Temporality, Black Political Possibility, and Poetry from the Future," Keeling discussed the experiences of Black queers through looking at films such as Looking for Langston, Brother to Brother, and The Aggressives. Keeling focuses her writing on the temporality and spatiality of the Black queer experience. Keeling also discussed figures such as Frantz Fanon and his lack of acknowledgement or discussion on this topic. She notes that in The Aggressives, time is marked by trends and products within hip-hop culture. Further expanding on the spatiotemporal nature, Keeling goes on to talk about the disappearance of one individual , M-. "Hir disappearance must prompt us to ask not the policing question attuned to the temporal and spatial logics of surveillance and control (where is M—today), but, rather, in this case, the political question of when M —’s visibility will enable hir survival by providing the protection the realm of the visible affords those whose existence is valued, those we want to look for so we can look out for and look after them" (577). Keeling clearly addresses the fact that the ways in which society functions in the temporal and spatial might not always be ideal for those labeled as the "Other," such as M-.

Selected works 

 Queer Times, Black Futures. NYU Press, 2019.
 "Queer OS." Cinema Journal, 2014
 "Two. I = Another: Digital Identity Politics." in Strange Affinities. Duke UP, 2011.
 "LOOKING FOR M—: Queer Temporality, Black Political Possibility, and Poetry from the Future." GLQ: Journal of Lesbian and Gay Studies, 2009.
 "Passing for human: Bamboozled and digital humanism." Women & Performance, 2008.
 The Witch's Flight: The Cinematic, the Black Femme, and the Image of Common Sense. Duke UP, 2007.
 "'Joining the Lesbians’': Cinematic Regimes of Black Lesbian Visibility." in Black Queer Studies. Duke UP, 2005.
 "'Ghetto Heaven': Set It Off and the Valorization of Black Lesbian Butch-Femme Sociality." The Black Scholar, 2003.
 "'In the Interval': Frantz Fanon and the 'Problems' of Visual Representation." Qui Parle, 2003.
 "'A Homegrown Revolutionary'?: Tupac Shakur and the Legacy of the Black Panther Party." The Black Scholar, 1999.

References

External links
 USC Cinematic Arts faculty page

Living people
University of Southern California faculty
1971 births
University of Pittsburgh alumni
Queer theorists
Presidents of the Children's Literature Association